Cilgerran is an electoral ward in Pembrokeshire, Wales. The ward consists of the communities of Cilgerran and Manordeifi. The community of Cilgerran consists of part of Pembrokeshire Coast National Park
 
A ward of Pembrokeshire County Council since 1995 it was previously a ward of the former Preseli Pembrokeshire District Council.

History
At the first election for the new Pembrokeshire County Council in 1995, a new Independent candidate was elected.

At the second election, in 1999, Dafydd Edwards was defeated by another Independent, John Davies. John Davies later became leader of the Council.

At the third election, in 2004 John Davies retained his seat by a large majority.

Davies was returned unopposed in 2008.

In 2012, Davies was re-elected by a huge majority.

References

Elections in Wales